McArthur Lake, MacArthurs Lake or MacArthur's Lake is the name of several lakes in Australia, Canada and the United States:

Gallery

References

Sources

McArthur